Meca or MECA may refer to:

Biology
 mecA (gene), responsible for methicillin resistance in MRSA
 Meca (moth), a snout moth genus in the subfamily Pyralinae

Places
 Meca (Alenquer), Portugal, a parish
 Los Caños de Meca, a seaside village in Spain
 Maine College of Art
 Middle East Center for the Arts, at Mana Contemporary in Jersey City, New Jersey

Other
 Maritime E-Commerce Association
 Marriage Equality California
 Meca (footballer) (born 1978), Spanish footballer
 Meca Tanaka, Japanese shojo manga artist,
 Middle East Children's Alliance

See also
 Mecca, a city in present-day Saudi Arabia
 Mecca (disambiguation)
 Mecha (disambiguation)
 Meca astralis, a species of moth